The year 1907 in architecture involved some significant architectural events and new buildings.

Events

 January – Plans for St David's Hotel, a hotel for golfers at Harlech, Gwynedd, Wales, are drawn up by the Glasgow School architect George Walton for a syndicate of entrepreneurs of which he is a member. The hotel closes in 2008, and planning permission for demolition is approved in 2009.
 May 18 – The foundation stone of Bedford School chapel in England, designed by G. F. Bodley, is laid.
 September 29 – The foundation stone of Washington National Cathedral in Washington, D.C., designed by G. F. Bodley, is laid.
 Deutscher Werkbund is founded by Hermann Muthesius in Munich.
 City plan for Barcelona by Léon Jaussely officially adopted.
 District plan for Highland Park, Texas, by Wilbur David Cook and George Kessler drawn up.
 English designer C. R. Ashbee is commissioned to build the Villa San Giorgio in Taormina, Sicily.

Buildings and structures

Buildings completed

 April 13 – Old New York Evening Post Building at 20 Vesey Street on Manhattan, designed in Art Nouveau style by Robert D. Kohn, opened.
 October 8 – Kirche am Steinhof in Vienna, designed by Otto Wagner.
 Great Mosque of Djenné in French Sudan.
 Port of Liverpool Building in Liverpool, England, designed by Sir Arnold Thornely.
 Tampere Cathedral, Finland, designed by Lars Sonck.
 Poti Cathedral in Georgia within the Russian Empire, designed by Alexander Zelenko and Robert Marfeld and constructed on the Hennebique system.
 St Matthew's Church, Paisley in Scotland, designed by W. D. McLennan.
 St. Joseph's Catholic Church (Krebs, Oklahoma).
 Rebuilt Sainte-Madeleine, Strasbourg, in Alsace-Lorraine, designed by Fritz Beblo.
 The Magasins Réunis, a large department store in Nancy, France, by Lucien Weissenburger (after seventeen years of work).
 Villa Fruhinsholz in Nancy, France, designed by Léon Cayotte.
 Stadttheater Barmen in Wuppertal and Stadttheater Düren, both designed by Carl Moritz in Germany.
 North Hall, the fifth dormitory on the quad  at Vassar College, USA. The building is renamed Jewett Hall in 1912 in honor of the College's first president, Milo P. Jewett.
 Rebuilt Basel SBB railway station in Switzerland, designed by Emil Faesch and Emmanuel La Roche.

Awards
 AIA Gold Medal – Aston Webb.
 RIBA Royal Gold Medal – John Belcher.

Births

 June 17 – Charles Eames, American designer (died 1978)
 July 7 – Ben-Ami Shulman, Israeli architect (died 1986)
 August 13
 J. M. Richards, English architectural writer (died 1992)
 Basil Spence, Indian-born British architect (died 1976)
 December 15 – Oscar Niemeyer, Brazilian architect (died 2012)
 Walter Segal, German-born architect, pioneer of self-build methods (died 1985)

Deaths
 January 24 – Vilhelm Dahlerup, Danish historicist architect (born 1826)
 May 6 – Emanuele Luigi Galizia, Maltese architect and civil engineer (born 1830)
 June 14 – William Le Baron Jenney, American architect credited with building the first skyscraper (born 1832)
 October 21 – George Frederick Bodley, English architect (born 1827)
 November 30 – Ludwig Levy, German Jewish historicist architect (born 1854)

References